Jan Stopczyk (born September 28, 1958) is a former Polish ice hockey player. He played for the Poland men's national ice hockey team at the 1984 Winter Olympics in Sarajevo, and the 1988 Winter Olympics in Calgary.

References

1958 births
Living people
Ice hockey players at the 1984 Winter Olympics
Ice hockey players at the 1988 Winter Olympics
Olympic ice hockey players of Poland
People from Zgierz
Polish ice hockey right wingers
Sportspeople from Łódź Voivodeship